Radic may refer to:

 Radić, South Slavic surname
 Radič, Serbian medieval given name
 Radíč, a village in Czechia